Greg Burns (born November 9, 1972) is an American football coach and former player who is currently an analyst at UCLA. He most recently served as defensive backs coach at the University of Southern California.

Playing career
Burns played defensive back at Washington State University where he was a four-year letter-winner. In his sophomore season he earned All-PAC-10 honors as an honorable mention.

Coaching career
Burns spent a year as a graduate assistant at Washington State in 1996 and earned his master's degree from WSU in 1997. He spent the 1997 season as an assistant at Idaho. He then coached defensive backs at Louisville from 1998 to 2001. During his tenure with the Cardinals he coached six All-Conference cornerbacks. Burns them moved on to coach the secondary at USC from 2002 to 2005 under head coach Pete Carroll. At USC Burns was a coach on the Trojans back-to-back National Championships in 2003 and 2004. He would also coach two All-American Safeties during his USC tenure. In 2006 Burns moved on to the professional ranks, coaching defensive backs for the Tampa Bay Buccaneers. He then spent one season in 2007 with Kansas State as a defensive back coach. He then held the same position with Arizona State from 2008 to 2011 and Purdue in 2012. In 2013 Burns was named to the staff at UMass to serve as the teams' defensive backs coach.

In his career, Burns has coached in 10 bowl games, including four Bowl Championship Series (BCS) bowl games and two national championship games.

References

External links
 California Golden Bears bio

1972 births
Living people
American football defensive backs
Arizona State Sun Devils football coaches
California Golden Bears football coaches
Idaho Vandals football coaches
Kansas State Wildcats football coaches
Louisville Cardinals football coaches
Purdue Boilermakers football coaches
Tampa Bay Buccaneers coaches
UMass Minutemen football coaches
USC Trojans football coaches
Washington State Cougars football coaches
Washington State Cougars football players
Sportspeople from Brooklyn
Players of American football from New York City
Players of American football from Los Angeles
African-American coaches of American football
African-American players of American football
21st-century African-American sportspeople
20th-century African-American sportspeople
Sports coaches from Los Angeles